Helmarshausen is a village and a part (Stadtteil) of the town of Bad Karlshafen in Hesse, central Germany. It was formerly the location of Helmarshausen Abbey, an Imperial abbey  (Reichsabtei) of the Holy Roman Empire. Helmarshausen lies on the river Diemel, 1.5 km south of Bad Karlshafen proper.

Villages in Hesse